Richard Bohomo Etiege (born May 9, 1980 in Yaoundé) is a Cameroonian footballer, who currently plays for Spandauer SV.

Career 
The defender played during his career for clubs in Malaysia, Belarus and Syria including Kuala Muda Naza FC, FC Gomel and Al-Karamah.

Honours
 1999–2000 Finalist of Cameroon cup with Canon of Yaoundé
 2002–2003 Champion of first league of Gabon and winner Gabon cup
 2002–2003 Best player of first league Gabon
 2008–2009 Syrian Premier League Champion, Syrian Cup winner 2009, 2010 and 2009 AFC Cup Runner-up with Al-Karamah.

References

External links
 

Living people
1980 births
Footballers from Yaoundé
Cameroonian footballers
Association football defenders
Cameroonian expatriate footballers
Expatriate footballers in Gabon
Expatriate footballers in the United Arab Emirates
Expatriate footballers in Malaysia
Expatriate footballers in Belarus
Expatriate footballers in Syria
Expatriate footballers in Lebanon
Expatriate footballers in Germany
Diamant Yaoundé players
Aigle Royal Menoua players
Canon Yaoundé players
US Bitam players
Dibba Al-Hisn Sports Club players
Kuala Muda Naza F.C. players
FC Gomel players
Al-Karamah players
Al Ahed FC players
SV Germania Schöneiche players
UAE First Division League players
Panthère du Ndé players
Cameroonian expatriate sportspeople in Lebanon
Lebanese Premier League players
Syrian Premier League players